The following is a list of estuaries in England:

 Adur Estuary
 Alnmouth Estuary
 Alt Estuary
 Arun Estuary
 Avon Estuary
 Axe Estuary
 Beaulieu River
 Blackwater Estuary
 Blue Anchor Bay
 Blyth Estuary
 Breydon Water
 Bridgwater Bay
 Camel Estuary
 Carrick Roads
 Chichester Harbour
 Christchurch Harbour
 Colne Estuary
 Coquet Estuary
 Crouch-Roach Estuary
 Cuckmere Estuary
 Dart Estuary
 Deben Estuary
 Dee Estuary
 Dengie Flats
 Duddon Estuary
 Eastern Yar
 Erme Estuary
 Esk Estuary
 Exe Estuary
 Fal Estuary
 Fowey Estuary
 Gannel Estuary
 Hamford Water
 Hayle Estuary
 Helford Estuary
 Humber Estuary
 Inner Solway Estuary
 Inner Thames Estuary
 Langstone Harbour
 Lindisfarne & Budle Bay
 Looe Estuary
 Lymington Estuary
 Maplin Sands
 Medina River
 Medway Estuary
 Mersey Estuary
 Morecambe Bay
 Newtown River
 North Norfolk Estuary
 Ore / Alde / Butley Estuary
 Orwell Estuary
 Otter Estuary
 Oulton Broad
 Ouse Estuary
 Pagham Harbour
 Pegwell Bay
 Plymouth Sound
 Poole Harbour
 Portsmouth Harbour
 Ribble Estuary
 Rother Estuary
 Salcombe and Kingsbridge Estuary
 Severn Estuary
 Southampton Water
 Stour Estuary
 Taw-Torridge Estuary
 Tees Estuary
 Teign Estuary
 Thames Estuary
 The Fleet and Portland Harbour
 The Swale
 The Wash
 Tweed Estuary
 Tyne Estuary
 Wansbeck Estuary
 Wear Estuary
 Western Yar
 Wootton Creek
 Wye Estuary
 Yealm Estuary

References

Sources

 Davidson, N. C. & A. L. Buck (1997) An inventory of UK estuaries. Volume 1. Introduction and methodology  Joint Nature Conservation Committee

 
Estuaries